Solen is a genus of marine bivalves in the family Solenidae. (Gk. 'solen'=pipe)

Species
It consists of the following species:

 Solen acinaces Hanley, 1843
 Solen acutangulus Dunker, 1868
 Solen aldridgei Nowell-Usticke, 1969
 Solen annandalei Preston, 1915
 Solen aureomaculatus Habe, 1964
 Solen brevissimus Martens, 1865
 † Solen burdigalensis Deshayes, 1839 
 Solen canaliculatus Tchang & Hwang, 1964
 Solen capensis P. Fischer, 1881
 Solen ceylonensis Leach, 1814
 Solen corneus Lamarck, 1818
 Solen crockeri Hertlein & Strong, 1950
 Solen crosnieri Cosel, 1989
 Solen cylindraceus Hanley, 1843
 Solen dactylus Cosel, 1989
 Solen darwinensis Cosel, 2002
 Solen delesserti Sowerby, 1874
 Solen digitalis Jousseaume, 1891
 Solen exiguus Dunker, 1862
 Solen fonesii Dunker, 1862
 † Solen franciscae Bazzacco, 2001 
 Solen gaudichaudi Chenu, 1843
 Solen gemmelli Cosel, 1992
 Solen grandis Dunker, 1862
 Solen gravelyi Ghosh, 1920
 Solen guinaicus Cosel, 1993
 Solen haae Thach, 2016
 Solen jonesii Sowerby, 1874
 Solen kajiyamai Habe, 1964
 Solen kempi Preston, 1915
 Solen kikuchii Cosel, 2002
 Solen krusensterni Schrenck, 1867
 Solen kurodai Habe, 1964
 Solen lamarckii Chenu, 1843
 Solen leanus Dunker, 1862
 Solen linearis Spengler, 1794
 Solen lischkeanus Dunker, 1865
 Solen madagascariensis Cosel, 1989
 Solen malaccensis Dunker, 1862
 Solen marginatus Pulteney, 1799
 Solen mexicanus Dall, 1899
 Solen oerstedii Mörch, 1860
 Solen pazensis Lowe, 1935
 Solen pfeifferi Dunker, 1862
 Solen poppei Thach, 2015
 Solen pseudolinearis Cosel, 2002
 Solen regularis Dunker, 1862
 Solen rosaceus Carpenter, 1864
 Solen roseomaculatus Pilsbry, 1901
 Solen rosewateri Van Regteren Altena, 1971
 Solen rostriformis Dunker, 1862
 Solen sarawakensis Cosel, 2002
 Solen schultzeanus Dunker, 1850
 Solen sicarius Gould, 1850
 Solen sloanii Gray, 1843
 Solen soleneae Cosel, 2002
 Solen strictus Gould, 1861
 Solen tairona Cosel, 1985
 Solen takekosugei Thach, 2020
 Solen tchangi Huber, 2010
 Solen thachi Cosel, 2002
 Solen thailandicus Cosel, 2002
 Solen thuelchus Hanley, 1842
 Solen timorensis Dunker, 1852
 Solen vagina Linnaeus, 1758
 Solen vaginoides Lamarck, 1818
 Solen viridis Say, 1821
 Solen vitreus Dunker, 1862
 Solen woodwardi Dunker, 1862

References

  Coan, E. V.; Valentich-Scott, P. (2012). Bivalve seashells of tropical West America. Marine bivalve mollusks from Baja California to northern Peru. 2 vols, 1258 pp

External links 
 Linnaeus, C. (1758). Systema Naturae per regna tria naturae, secundum classes, ordines, genera, species, cum characteribus, differentiis, synonymis, locis. Editio decima, reformata [10th revised edition, vol. 1: 824 pp. Laurentius Salvius: Holmiae.]
 Solen at WoRMS

Solenidae
Bivalve genera